Brett Baudinet (born 1 November 1981) is a Cook Islands businessman and tennis player. He has represented the Cook Islands at the Pacific Mini Games, and Oceania at the Davis Cup.

Personal life
Baudinet grew up in the Cook Islands, and moved to New Zealand at the age of 14 to attend King's College, Auckland. After time in the USA, he returned to Rarotonga in 2012. He runs a tourism business.

Tennis career
Baudinet first represented the Cook Islands at tennis at the age of eight in the Aotearoa Māori Tennis Championships in New Zealand. He played in his first Davis Cup match in February 2000. He later moved to the USA to study, where he played for the University of Michigan.

In September 2017 he was awarded the Davis Cup Commitment Award for outstanding services to tennis for playing 50 Davis Cup matches.

In October 2018 he was awarded Sportsman of the Year at the Cook Islands Sports Awards.

In March 2021 Baudinet was selected as captain of the Pacific Oceania Davis Cup team, becoming the first Cook Islander to captain the team.

References

Cook Island tennis players
Living people
1981 births
Michigan Wolverines men's tennis players